The 1988 Montana State Bobcats football team was an American football team that represented Montana State University in the Big Sky Conference (Big Sky) during the 1988 NCAA Division I-AA football season. In their second season under head coach Earle Solomonson, the Bobcats compiled a 4–7 record (4–4 against Big Sky opponents) and finished a four-way tie for fourth place in the Big Sky.

Schedule

References

Montana State
Montana State Bobcats football seasons
Montana State Bobcats football